The Christ the Lord of Harvest Academy, Inc. or "CLHA, Inc." is a private Christian institution of learning in San Mateo, Rizal, Philippines particularly in Silangan. CLHA is a non-stock, non-profit and non-sectarian educational institution. It was established by Mrs. Eden D. Lozande on February 12, 1995.

History
1995 - first named as Christ the Lord of Harvest Learning Center, offering preschool education, located in B14 L15 AFP Village, Silangan, San Mateo, Rizal.
1995 - operation started with the preschool level for two years.
1997 - opened its doors to Elementary. Set up its main site at B30 L5, on the same village.
1998 - CLHLC transferred to the main site which has its first building.
2001 - additional buildings were built to accommodate the student population which were already open up to the Secondary levels. Learning Center changed to Academy.
2003 - added another building for the increasing number of High school students.
2005 - first batch of High school students graduated.
2008 - celebration of the 13th Founding Anniversary and the inauguration of CLHA Alumni Association.
2010 - now offers basic short courses (Tech-Voc Computer Courses; in partnership with ACLC) 
2010 - new church building opened in the former basketball court area.
2011 - rehabilitation of the old assembly area into the school's playing field.
2018 - no longer active

Location
Christ the Lord of Harvest Academy, Incorporated is located in Silangan, San Mateo, Rizal.

Extra-curricular activities
Weekly Chapel Service during Wednesdays, programs and festivities. The school joins other schools in watching Theater plays and dramas, Field Trips, High school Retreat and Turnover Ceremonies.

References

 Official website

External links
 Christ the Lord of Harvest Academy, Inc. Official website

Schools in Rizal
Educational institutions established in 1995
High schools in Rizal
1995 establishments in the Philippines
Education in San Mateo, Rizal